An Institute of Science is an educational institution that imparts higher education in various scientific disciplines.

Institute of Science may also refer to:

Austria
 Institute of Science and Technology, Austria

Bangladesh
 Institute of Science and Technology, Bangladesh

Canada
 Nova Scotian Institute of Science, Nova Scotia

China
 Guangdong Institute of Science and Technology, Tianhe District of Guangzhou City, Guangdong Province, China.
 Hunan Institute of Science and Technology, Hunan, China

India
 The Institute of Science, Mumbai, formerly known as Royal Institute of Science, Bombay
 Bansal Institute of Science and Technology, Bhopal, India
 Dasari Ramakotiah Institute of Science and Technology, Telangana, India
 Federal Institute of Science and Technology, Angamaly, Kerala
 Global Institute of Science & Technology, Haldia, West Bengal, India 
 Indian Institute of Science Education and Research, Mohali, Punjab, India 
 Indian Institute of Science Education and Research, Thiruvananthapuram, Kerala 
 Indian Institute of Science, Bangalore
 Indian Institute of Space Science and Technology, Valiamala, Thiruvananthapuram, Kerala
 Indian Institutes of Science Education and Research, India
 Institute of Science and Technology, West Bengal
 Institute of Science and Technology, West Bengal, Paschim Medinipur district 
 Institute of Science, Banaras Hindu University, Varanasi
 Konark Institute of Science and Technology, Bhubaneswar 
 Lal Bahadur Shastri Integrated Institute of Science and Technology Malappuram, Kerala
 National Institute of Science and Technology, Berhampur 
 National Institute of Science Education and Research, Bhubaneswar 
 National Institute of Science, Technology and Development Studies, New Delhi, India
 Oriental Institute of Science and Technology, Bhopal
 Postgraduate Institute of Science, University of Peradeniya
 Toc H Institute of Science and Technology, Ernakulam district 

Israel
 Weizmann Institute of Science, Rehovot, Israel

Japan
 Institute of Science Tokyo, Tokyo (tentative name of the new university where Tokyo Medical and Dental University and Tokyo Institute of Technology will merge)

Pakistan
 Shaheed Zulfikar Ali Bhutto Institute of Science and Technology, Pakistan

Philippines
 Eulogio "Amang" Rodriguez Institute of Science and Technology, Philippines

Rwanda
 Kigali Institute of Science and Technology, Kigali, Rwanda

Singapore
 German Institute of Science and Technology (Singapore), Singapore

South Korea
 Dongwon Institute of Science and Technology, Yangsan City, South Gyeongsang province, South Korea
 Gwangju Institute of Science and Technology, Gwangju, South Korea

Taiwan
 National Chung-Shan Institute of Science and Technology, Longtan District, Taoyuan, Taiwan

Tanzania
 Nelson Mandela African Institute of Science and Technology, Arusha, Tanzania

Thailand
 Thailand Graduate Institute of Science and Technology, Thailand 

United Kingdom
 Institute of Science and Technology, UK
 University of Manchester Institute of Science and Technology, England

Educational institution disambiguation pages